Pancuran Tujuh (both meaning "Seven Springs") is a hot spring located on the slopes of Mount Slamet in Baturraden District, Banyumas, Central Java. Discovered, according to local legend, by a Muslim missionary known as Mbah Atas Angin, the hot spring and its sulfuric waters are considered to have healing properties.

Location

Pancuran Tujuh is located in Kemutung Lor Village, Baturraden District, Banyumas, Central Java, amidst a pine forest on the slopes of Mount Slamet.

The hot spring is accessible by paved road, though, it is in poor condition, and as such it is more common for visitors to take motorcycles than cars.  Pancuran Tujuh can also be accessed by a  walk through the Baturraden resort. From the parking area, visitors must descend about 200 steps (a distance of ) to reach the springs.

History
According to local legend, a man named Syekh Maulana Maghribi (known locally as Mbah Atas Angin [Grandfather from the Winds] as he had come a great distance) discovered the springs. Sailing to Gresik on Java to spread Islam, he and a follower spotted a strange light. They followed it to Pemalang, then made their way overland. However, Maghribi fell ill with a strange skin condition, and received a vision that he had to climb the southern mountains to treat it. There he found seven springs, which he named Pancuran Pitu, and bathed in the waters, treating himself.

The Pancuran Tujuh area is, managed by the state-owned Perhutani company.

Description

A 2003 study found the spring to have a consistent flow, averaging  a day.

The waters contain sulfur and other minerals, with the sulfur content measuring 230.8 parts per million. As such, the waters are considered to have healing properties by local residents, and the springs are used to treat skin conditions and rheumatism. The sulfuric waters of Pancuran Tujuh pour down the slope, and over the centuries have left a mineral deposit.

Waters from Pancuran Tujuh also pool in nearby caves. These include Sarabadak, where Mbah Atas Angin and his followers are held to have lived, as well as Kembar, Selirang, and Sri Warna. Sarabadak serves as a petilasan (monument) to Mbah Atas Angin, with its entrance located next to the springs. The path to Pancuran Tujuh overlooks nearby Purwokerto, with the cities of Purbalingga and Cilacap visible on clear days.

References

Works cited

External links

Hot springs of Indonesia
Tourist attractions in Central Java
Banyumas Regency